Pope Leo XI (2 June 153527 April 1605), born Alessandro Ottaviano de' Medici, was head of the Catholic Church and ruler of the Papal States from 1 April 1605 to his death in 27 April 1605. His pontificate is one of the briefest in history, having lasted under a month. He was from the prominent House of Medici originating from Florence. Medici's mother opposed his entering the priesthood and sought to prevent it by having him given secular honours, but after her death he eventually was ordained a priest in 1567. In his career he served as Florence's ambassador to the pope, Bishop of Pistoia, Archbishop of Florence, papal legate to France, and as the cardinal Prefect for the Congregation of the Bishops and Religious. He was elected to the papacy in the March 1605 papal conclave and served as pope for 27 days.

Biography

Early life 
Alessandro Ottaviano de' Medici was born in Florence as the son of Ottaviano de' Medici and Francesca Salviati. His family belonged to Medici di Ottajano, a cadet branch of the Medici family. He was also the great-nephew of Pope Leo X. Ottaviano died early in his son’s life, and thereafter Alessandro was home schooled by a Dominican priest, Vincenzo Ercolano.

Alessandro felt the call to the priesthood, but his mother opposed this since he was the only male in the family. She sent him instead to the court of the Grand Duke of Tuscany, who appointed him a knight of San Stefano. In 1560 he travelled to Rome where he commenced a lifelong friendship and collaboration with Philip Neri, the future saint. It was Philip who predicted that Alessandro would ascend to the pontificate. His mother died in 1566, at which point he resumed his studies to become a priest. His ordination took place on 22 July 1567.

Priesthood 

In March 1573 he received episcopal consecration in Rome. In 1574 he was made Archbishop of Florence.

In 1583 he was made a cardinal by Pope Sixtus V and on 9 January 1584 received the title of  Cardinal-Priest of Santi Quirico e Giulitta, after a titular church previously known as San Ciriaco alle Terme Diocleziane. In later years, according to custom he would opt for other titular churches.

In 1596 Pope Clement VIII sent Alessandro as a papal legate to France, where he remained  until 1598, when he received word of his appointment as Prefect of the Congregation of Bishops and Regulars.

Pontificate

Papal election 

On 14 March 1605, eleven days after the death of Clement VIII, 62 cardinals entered the conclave. Prominent among the candidates for the papacy were the great historian Cesare Baronius and the famous Jesuit controversialist Robert Bellarmine, future saint.

But Pietro Aldobrandini, the leader of the Italian party among the cardinals, allied with the French cardinals and brought about the election of Alessandro against the express wish of King Philip III of Spain. King Henry IV of France is said to have spent 300,000 écus in the promotion of Alessandro's candidacy.

On 1 April 1605, Cardinal Alessandro de' Medici was elected as pope. He chose to be called Leo XI in honor of his uncle Pope Leo X. He was crowned on 10 April 1605 by the protodeacon, Cardinal Francesco Sforza and he took possession of the Basilica of Saint John Lateran on 17 April 1605.

Death 
When he was elected, Leo XI was almost 70 years of age, and he died 27 days later.  His death came as a result of fatigue and cold in the ceremony of taking possession of the Basilica of St John Lateran on 17 April; he started suffering from a fever the following day.

See also 
 List of popes
 List of popes from the Medici family
 List of popes by length of reign

References

External links 

 
  Catholic Hierarchy, Pope Leo XI
 Cardinals of the Holy Roman Church, Cardinal Medici

Popes
Italian popes
Cardinal-bishops of Albano
Cardinal-bishops of Palestrina
Cardinal-bishops of Porto
Cardinal-bishops of Sabina
Apostolic Nuncios to France
Roman Catholic archbishops of Florence
Clergy from Florence
1535 births
1605 deaths
17th-century popes
House of Medici
Burials at St. Peter's Basilica